Pia Miranda (born 15 June 1973) is an Australian actress whose career was launched with her role in the 2000 feature film Looking for Alibrandi, an Australian film based on the novel of the same name by Melina Marchetta. She is also known for her roles as Karen Oldman in Neighbours (1998-1999), Jodie Spiteri in Wentworth (2015), and Jen in Mustangs FC (2017-2020), as well as winning Australian Survivor in 2019.

Early life 
Born in Melbourne, Victoria, Miranda spent the majority of her early life travelling throughout Australia with her family, attending a large number of schools. She is of Italian and Irish descent. After completing her high school certificate at the Sacré Cœur School, Miranda studied history and drama at La Trobe University before transferring to Victoria University, where she majored in drama and graduated with a Bachelor of Arts (Performance Studies) in 1996.

Career

Film and television career

After university, Miranda studied drama at the Atlantic Theater Company in New York for one year before playing Karen Oldman on the Australian soap Neighbours, from 1998 to 1999. At this time, she was also starring in the ABC television series 'Bondi Banquet', playing Jo Tognetti. This was the starting point for Miranda's future success within the Australian film and television industry, quickly being chosen for the role of Josephine Alibrandi in the hugely successful Australian movie Looking for Alibrandi, directed by Kate Woods in 1999.

The movie was based on the novel written by Melina Marchetta in 1992, where seventeen-year-old Josephine Alibrandi deals with the stresses of Year Twelve, her illegitimacy, the reunion with her father, new-found companionship, the death of her close friend and life as a third-generation migrant in contemporary Australian society. Miranda co-starred with fellow prominent Australian actors Kick Gurry, Anthony LaPaglia, Greta Scacchi, Elana Cotta and Matthew Newton. The movie received critical acclaim, with Pia Miranda receiving the Australian Film Institute award in 2000 for Best Actress for her performance. Her role in Looking for Alibrandi also earned her a nomination in 2001 for an FCCA Award in the Best Actor - Female category which she lost to Julia Blake.

In 2002, Miranda played a small role in the US movie, Queen of the Damned, although her scene was cut from the film as it appeared on the DVD. Also in 2002, Pia Miranda starred in The Doppelgangers. The movie was part of a project where eight Australian filmmakers were given a short film script by celebrated writer Brendan Cowell. Filmmakers had to name their own film and characters and adhere to a set of rules, such as shooting on digital cameras and making no dialogue changes. The project had limited success.

Following The Doppelgangers, Miranda starred in another Australian film Garage Days, playing Tanya. The coming-of-age comedy revolved around a young Sydney band trying to gain a foothold in the competitive pub rock scene. The movie was well received within Australia and is available on DVD. In 2003, Miranda played the role of Leanne Ferris in Travelling Light, about two sisters growing up in Adelaide in the early 1970s. Following this, Miranda also starred in Right Here Right Now in 2004.

Though Miranda is best known as a film actress, she has also featured in some television series. She was a recurring guest star on the long-running drama All Saints in 1998, the drama The Time of Our Lives in 2013 and 2014, and the popular Australian drama The Secret Life of Us, playing Talia. Miranda has also been featured in The Glass House, Grass Roots and the Australian talk shows The Panel and The Project.

Miranda has also worked as a celebrity artist for A Midwinter Night's Dream, a ticketed charity auction of art with pillow cases as the medium and inspired by the childhood dreams of artists and celebrities, to raise money for War Child Australia and was a judge for the 2005 Project Greenlight competition alongside fellow actors such as Sam Worthington. Miranda's sister, Nicole, starred in the Australian film Moving Out with Vince Colosimo. In 2014, she performed in Standing on Ceremony, nine plays on gay marriage written by Neil LaBute and Paul Rudnick.

Recently, Miranda starred in the popular Australian prison drama Wentworth in 2015. She has played a recurring role in the teenage comedy drama Mustangs FC as Jen since 2017.

Miranda was a contestant on the sixth season of Australian Survivor. A long time fan of the Survivor franchise, Miranda's casting resulted from an interview with the television blog TV Tonight, where she revealed her "Guilty Pleasure" of Survivor. She ultimately won the series, winning the Final Jury Vote unanimously 9–0 over fellow finalist Baden Gilbert. In 2021 she was inducted into the Australian Survivor Hall Of Fame.

In 2022, Miranda appeared as Thong on the fourth season of The Masked Singer Australia. She was the third contestant to be revealed, and placed tenth overall.

Personal life
In March 2001, Miranda married her boyfriend Luke Hanigan, lead singer and guitarist of the Australian band Lo-Tel, at the Elvis Presley chapel in Las Vegas after four months of dating. The couple have two children, Lily and James.

Filmography

Film

Television

Podcasts

Audiobooks
 What Zola Did on Monday (2020, written by Melina Marchetta)

References

External links

1973 births
Australian television actresses
Living people
Australian people of Italian descent
Australian film actresses
Victoria University, Melbourne alumni
La Trobe University alumni
Actresses from Melbourne
20th-century Australian actresses
21st-century Australian actresses
Australian Survivor contestants
Winners in the Survivor franchise
Best Actress AACTA Award winners
People educated at Sacré Cœur School
Survivor (franchise) winners